Diksis is one of the woredas in the Oromia Region of Ethiopia. It is part of the Arsi Zone. It was separated from Tena woreda.

Demographics 
The 2007 national census reported a total population for this woreda of 72,301, of whom 35,970 were men and 36,331 were women; 7,854 or 10.86% of its population were urban dwellers. The majority of the inhabitants said they were Muslim, with 62.92% of the population reporting they observed this belief, while 36.71% of the population practised Ethiopian Orthodox Christianity.

Notes 

Districts of Oromia Region